The 2013 Balochistan earthquakes took place in late September in southwestern Pakistan. The mainshock had a moment magnitude of 7.7 and a maximum Mercalli intensity of IX (Violent). At least 825 people were killed and hundreds more were injured.

Tectonic setting
On a broad scale, the tectonics of southern and central Pakistan reflect a complex plate boundary where the India plate slides northward relative to the Eurasia plate in the east, and the Arabia plate subducts northward beneath the Eurasia plate in the Makran (western Pakistan). These motions typically result in north–south to northeast–southwest strike-slip motion at the latitude of the 24 September earthquake that is primarily accommodated on the Chaman Fault, with the earthquake potentially occurring on one of the southernmost strands of this fault system. Further, more in-depth studies will be required to identify the precise fault associated with this event. Although seismically active, this portion of the Eurasia plate boundary region has not experienced large damaging earthquakes in recent history. In the past 40 years, only one significant event has occurred within  of this event, which was a Mw 6.1 earthquake in July 1990 that killed six people.

Earthquake

The United States Geological Survey reported that the earthquake took place on Tuesday 24 September 2013 at 11:29:48 UTC. The depth was reported to be . The earthquake reportedly lasted about a minute, causing panic in cities of southern Pakistan such as Karachi and Hyderabad.

The earthquake in occurred as the result of oblique-strike-slip type motion at shallow crustal depths. The location and mechanism of the earthquake are consistent with rupture within the Eurasia plate above the Makran Trench subduction zone. The event occurred within the transition zone between northward subduction of the Arabian plate beneath the Eurasia plate and northward collision of the India plate with the Eurasia plate.

Damage
The earthquake killed at least 825 people and injured hundreds of others. The earthquake struck a sparsely populated region of Pakistan. Most homes and buildings in the region are constructed of mud bricks and collapsed during the earthquake and aftershocks. An official in the Balochistan province claimed that 80 percent of the homes in the Awaran District had collapsed or were damaged. In the regional capital Quetta, some areas appeared to be badly damaged. Officials from the Balochistan government estimated that at least 21,000 houses had been completely destroyed by the tremor, while some areas remained beyond the reach of rescue services 48 hours after the initial quake.

PAGER impact estimates from the United States Geological Survey included a red alert level for initial shaking-related fatalities (35% chance of 1,000–10,000 fatalities, 27% chance of 10,000–100,000 fatalities) and an orange alert level for economic impact (35% chance of US$100 million–$1 billion, 26% chance of US$1–10 billion).

The earthquake was felt in major cities across Pakistan, including Karachi, Hyderabad, Rawalpindi/Islamabad, Larkana, and Lahore. The quake was also felt in Delhi, India, where some buildings shook, and Muscat, Oman— from the epicenter—where mild tremors shook tables and cabinets. The earthquake shook in the parts of UAE, Iraq, Afghanistan, Iran and Qatar. The earthquake also shook Saravan, Iran without causing any damage or casualties. There were also minor tremors and aftershocks in the United Arab Emirates.

Ground effects

The island is partially composed of rock, but mostly consists of mud and sand. They noticed a smell of gas and managed to ignite it, later extinguishing it with difficulty.

The island is believed to be the result of a mud volcano. In the region, deposits of frozen gas hydrates—which have a large methane content—exist beneath  of compressed sediment. After such a large earthquake, the gas hydrates converted from frozen to gaseous form through the heat of friction and either raised the overlaying sediment enough to create fissures through which it escaped or rose through fissures resulting from the earthquake itself. Another possible contributing factor in the island's creation was the liquefaction of the seabed, which allowed finer, loosely packed sediments to become liquid-like and squeeze up through fissures in overlying compressed sediment. Locals who ventured to the island shortly after it formed heard a hissing noise at one end and started a fire which was difficult to extinguish. There are several mud volcanoes inland near Zalzala Jazeera and they are common in the vicinity of subducting plate boundaries; in fact, similar islands have appeared in the same region following earthquakes in 1945, 1999, 2001, and 2010. Because of its composition of softer sediments, the sea was predicted to erode the island completely within a few months. By the end of 2016, the island had completely disappeared.

Tsunami

Aftershocks

Aftermath
On 26 September, two days after the disaster, two rockets were fired at a helicopter carrying Maj. Gen. Muhammad Saeed Aleem, the National Disaster Management Authority chairman, as well as other officials and members of the media. Government sources blamed Balochi separatists, who are very active in the Awaran area.

See also 

List of earthquakes in 2013
List of earthquakes in Pakistan

References

Sources

External links
 M7.7 - 61km NNE of Awaran, Pakistan – United States Geological Survey.
 Pakistan quake island off Gwadar 'emits flammable gas' – BBC News
 
 

2013 earthquakes
2013 disasters in Pakistan
Earthquakes in Pakistan
History of Balochistan, Pakistan (1947–present)
2
September 2013 events in Pakistan
Earthquake clusters, swarms, and sequences